Ribeira do Rabil is a seasonal stream in the central and western part of the island of Boa Vista in Cape Verde. Its source is in the southeastern part of the island, north of the island's highest point Monte Estância. It flows generally northwest, passes east of the town Rabil and flows into the Atlantic Ocean near the Aristides Pereira International Airport. The estuary, Lagoa do Rabil, is an important wetland area.

See also
List of streams in Cape Verde

References

Rabil
Geography of Boa Vista, Cape Verde